Volar may refer to:

Volar, Afghanistan, a town in Badakhshan Province
Volar, Slovenia, a hamlet within the Ljubljana Marsh
Volar Airlines, later branded as LTE, based in Palma de Mallorca, Spain
Project VOLAR, or Project Volunteer Army, a US Army post-Vietnam War program
Volar, an anatomical term meaning palmar, plantar, or both, referring to the palm side of the hand, the sole side of the foot, or both (they are homologously ventral)
 Volar interosseous nerve or anterior interosseous nerve, a branch of the median nerve connecting to certain forearm muscles
 Volar interosseous artery or anterior interosseous artery, an artery in the forearm

See also 
 Palmar (disambiguation), an anatomical term sometimes used as a synonym
 A Volar, a song by boy band Menudo